There have been three baronetcies created for persons with the surname Everard, one in the Baronetage of Ireland, one in the Baronetage of England and one in the Baronetage of the United Kingdom. Only one creation is extant as of 2010.

The Everard Baronetcy, of Ballyboy in the County of Tipperary, was created in the Baronetage of Ireland on 30 April 1622 for Richard Everard of Fethard, County Tipperary. He was the second son of Sir John Everard (died 1624), justice of the Court of King's Bench (Ireland), and member of the Irish House of Commons for Tipperary. Sir John was a devout Roman Catholic, and this led both to his dismissal from the Bench and his disqualification from office after his election as Speaker in the Irish Parliament of 1613; but the fact that his son was created a baronet in his father's lifetime suggests that Sir John was still held in high regard by the Crown. Richard shared his father's religious beliefs: he was a prominent member of Confederate Ireland, and was condemned to death by the victorious Cromwellian forces in 1651, but he was reprieved and allowed to die in prison about 10 years later. The third Baronet was killed at the Battle of Aughrim in 1691, fighting on the losing side. His estates were forfeited, but his son later recovered them. The fourth Baronet was created Viscount Everard in the Jacobite Peerage in 1723. The titles became extinct on his death in exile in France in 1742, without issue.

The Everard Baronetcy, of Much Waltham in the County of Essex, was created in the Baronetage of England on 29 January 1629 for Richard Everard. The second Baronet represented Westmorland in Parliament from 1661 to 1678. The fourth Baronet served as Governor of North Carolina from 1725 to 1731. The title became extinct on the death of the sixth Baronet in 1745.

The Everard Baronetcy, of Randlestown in the County of Meath, was created in the Baronetage of the United Kingdom on 30 June 1911 for Nugent Everard. He was Lord-Lieutenant of County Meath and a Senator of the Irish Free State from 1922 to 1928.

Everard baronets, of Ballyboy (1622)
Sir Richard Everard, 1st Baronet (died c.1660)
Sir Redmond Everard, 2nd Baronet (died 1687)
Sir John Everard, 3rd Baronet (died 1691)
Sir Redmond Everard, 4th Baronet (died 1742)

Everard baronets, of Much Waltham (1629)
Sir Richard Everard, 1st Baronet (died 1680)
Sir Richard Everard, 2nd Baronet (1625–1694)
Sir Hugh Everard, 3rd Baronet (c. 1654–1706)
Sir Richard Everard, 4th Baronet (c. 1683–1733)
Sir Richard Everard, 5th Baronet (died 1742)
Sir Hugh Everard, 6th Baronet (died 1745)

Everard baronets, of Randlestown (1911)

Sir Nugent Talbot Everard, 1st Baronet (1849–1929)
Sir Richard William Everard, 2nd Baronet (1874–1929)
Sir Nugent Henry Everard, 3rd Baronet (1905–1984)
Sir Robin Charles Everard, 4th Baronet (1939–2010)
Sir Henry Peter Charles Everard, 5th Baronet (born 1970)

The heir apparent is the present holder's son, Benjamin Richard Nugent Everard (born 2005).

Notes

References 
Kidd, Charles & Williamson, David (editors). Debrett's Peerage and Baronetage (1990 edition). New York: St Martin's Press, 1990,

External links
Picture and short biography of Sir Nugent Everard, 1st Baronet, at askaboutireland.ie

Everard
Extinct baronetcies in the Baronetage of England
Extinct baronetcies in the Baronetage of Ireland